Propionyl coenzyme A carboxylase may refer to:
 Methylmalonyl-CoA decarboxylase, an enzyme
 Propionyl-CoA carboxylase, an enzyme